Ratio is an unincorporated community in Phillips County, Arkansas, United States.

The etymology of the name "Ratio" is obscure.

References

Unincorporated communities in Phillips County, Arkansas
Unincorporated communities in Arkansas